Efiewura also spelled Ofiwura, Ofiewura (meaning "Landlord" or “ruler/master of house” in Twi) is a popular Ghanaian television sitcom that airs on TV3 Ghana, in the Akan language.  The series focused on how landlords treat tenants and the relationship that exist between tenant.  It started in 2001, and is still in production, making it the longest running show in the country.  It has won several local television awards.

Cast
Cast members of the long-running show have included:
John Evans Bosompi as Santo
Margret Quainoo as Araba Stamp
Micheal Moncar
Harriet Naa Akleh Okantey (Auntie B)
Lucky Azasoo-Nkornoo
Ebenezer Donkor (Katawere)
Abeiku Aggrey Santana
Kofi Agyiri
 Kwame Djokoto
 Koo Fori
AJ Poundz
 Florence Boateng
 Seth Kwabena Kyere Karikari (Koo Fori)
 Joojo Robertson
Adwoa Smart
 Felix Bell
 Rosamond Brown (Akuapem Polo)
Gloria Sarfo
Kwame Dzokoto

References

Ghanaian television series
2010s Ghanaian television series
2000s Ghanaian television series
Television shows about landlords
2001 Ghanaian television series debuts
TV3 Ghana original programming